The 22nd Los Angeles Film Critics Association Awards, honoring the best in film for 1996, were given in December 1996.

Winners
Best Picture:
Secrets & Lies
Runner-up: Fargo
Best Director:
Mike Leigh – Secrets & Lies
Runner-up: Joel Coen – Fargo
Best Actor:
Geoffrey Rush – Shine
Runner-up: Eddie Murphy – The Nutty Professor
Best Actress:
Brenda Blethyn – Secrets & Lies
Runner-up: Frances McDormand – Fargo
Best Supporting Actor:
Edward Norton – Everyone Says I Love You, The People vs. Larry Flynt and Primal Fear
Runner-up: Armin Mueller-Stahl – Shine
Best Supporting Actress:
Barbara Hershey – The Portrait of a Lady
Runner-up: Courtney Love – The People vs. Larry Flynt
Best Screenplay:
Joel and Ethan Coen – Fargo
Runner-up: Joseph Tropiano and Stanley Tucci – Big Night
Best Cinematography (tie):
Chris Menges – Michael Collins
John Seale – The English Patient
Best Production Design (tie):
Brian Morris - Evita
Janet Patterson - The Portrait of a Lady
Best Music Score:
Hal Willner and The Hey Hey Club Musicians – Kansas City
Runner-up: Elliot Goldenthal – Michael Collins
Best Foreign-Language Film:
La Cérémonie • France/Germany
Runner-up: Lamerica • Italy/France/Switzerland
Best Non-Fiction Film:
When We Were Kings
Runner-up: Paradise Lost: The Child Murders at Robin Hood Hills
Best Animation:
Nick Park (for his body of work, which includes: Creature Comforts, A Grand Day Out, The Wrong Trousers, and A Close Shave)
The Douglas Edwards Experimental/Independent Film/Video Award:
Craig Baldwin – Sonic Outlaws
New Generation Award:
Emily Watson – Breaking the Waves
Career Achievement Award:
Roger Corman

References

External links
22nd Annual Los Angeles Film Critics Association Awards

1996
Los Angeles Film Critics Association Awards
Los Angeles Film Critics Association Awards
Los Angeles Film Critics Association Awards
Los Angeles Film Critics Association Awards